Scleria reticularis, also known as the reticulated nutrush or netted nutrush, is a plant in the sedge family Cyperaceae.

Distribution and habitat
Scleria reticularis grows naturally in the southern, central and eastern United States. Its habitat is bogs and wetlands from sea-level to  altitude.

References

reticularis
Flora of the United States